Jorge Azevedo (born 10 May 1950) is a Brazilian archer. He competed in the men's individual event at the 1988 Summer Olympics.

References

1950 births
Living people
Brazilian male archers
Olympic archers of Brazil
Archers at the 1988 Summer Olympics
Sportspeople from Rio de Janeiro (city)
20th-century Brazilian people